Michael Arthur Kinkade (born May 6, 1973) is an American college baseball coach and former Major League Baseball player. He played for the New York Mets, Baltimore Orioles, and Los Angeles Dodgers between 1998 and 2003, and is currently an assistant coach at California State University, Bakersfield.

Amateur career

After graduating from Tigard High School in Tigard, Oregon, Kinkade was a collegiate star at Washington State University, where he played college baseball for the Cougars from 1992–1995. After the 1994 season, he played collegiate summer baseball with the Falmouth Commodores of the Cape Cod Baseball League and was named a league all-star. Kinkade had been drafted in by the Milwaukee Brewers in the 19th round of the 1994 June draft, with the 515th overall pick, but elected to return to school for his senior year instead of turning pro. The Brewers drafted him again the next year, in the ninth round with the 236th overall pick, and this time he signed the contract.

Professional career

Milwaukee Brewers
Kinkade was an immediate success in the minor leagues, splitting time between catching and playing in the outfield. The next season, Kinkade was again an All-Star, this time in the Midwest League. He batted .385 with a .455 on-base percentage, a .588 slugging percentage, and 17 stolen bases, though he also committed 60 errors in the field.

New York Mets
On July 31, the Brewers traded Kinkade to the New York Mets, in exchange for left-handed pitcher Bill Pulsipher. Along with fellow pitching prospects Jason Isringhausen and Paul Wilson, Pulsipher had been promoted by the Mets as a part of "Generation K", a trio of starting pitchers who were supposed to carry the team's rotation for the next decade. Isringhausen and Wilson sustained arm injuries, while Pulsipher encountered control problems, and none enjoyed any substantial success with the Mets.

After the trade, Kinkade struggled with the Mets' AAA affiliate at Norfolk. He made his major league debut on September 8, 1998, in a 16-4 loss to the Philadelphia Phillies, but struggled to establish himself in the bigs.

Surprisingly, Kinkade's season in Binghamton marked a resurgence in his career. He was named to the Eastern League All-Star team, and on July 28, was traded to the Baltimore Orioles, giving him a fresh start with a new franchise. The Mets sent Kinkade, Melvin Mora, Lesli Brea, and prospect Pat Gorman to the Orioles, in order to acquire All-Star shortstop Mike Bordick for a playoff run. Bordick helped the Mets reach the World Series that year, but the deal proved costly; Bordick returned to the Orioles as a free agent that off-season, and Mora developed into a star in his own right.

Olympics
Kinkade appeared in three games with the Orioles at the end of the year, then left for Sydney to represent the United States of America at the 2000 Summer Olympics. America's baseball team won the gold medal, and Kinkade played a key role, getting on base in the seventh inning of a semifinal game against South Korea and scoring America's second run in a come-from-behind 3-2 win.

Baltimore Orioles and Los Angeles Dodgers
He signed with the Los Angeles Dodgers as a free agent that off-season, then enjoyed tremendous success as a bench player, batting .380 with seven extra-base hits in only 50 at bats.

Japan and minor leagues
On February 23, he signed a minor league contract with the Seattle Mariners.

References

External links

Kinkade's minor league statistics at The Toronto Star

1973 births
Living people
Baltimore Orioles players
Baseball players at the 2000 Summer Olympics
American expatriate baseball players in Japan
Hanshin Tigers players
Los Angeles Dodgers players
Major League Baseball first basemen
Major League Baseball outfielders
Baseball players from Michigan
Major League Baseball third basemen
New York Mets players
Olympic gold medalists for the United States in baseball
Sportspeople from Livonia, Michigan
Washington State Cougars baseball players
Norfolk Tides players
Rochester Red Wings players
Las Vegas 51s players
Buffalo Bisons (minor league) players
Albuquerque Isotopes players
Iowa Cubs players
Trenton Thunder players
Scranton/Wilkes-Barre Yankees players
Tacoma Rainiers players
Somerset Patriots players
Falmouth Commodores players
Cal State Bakersfield Roadrunners baseball coaches
People from Tigard, Oregon
Medalists at the 2000 Summer Olympics